Railways with a track gauge of  were first constructed as horse-drawn wagonways. The first intercity passenger railway to use 3 ft 6 in was constructed in Norway by Carl Abraham Pihl. From the mid-nineteenth century, the  gauge became widespread in the British Empire. In Africa it became known as the Cape gauge as it was adopted as the standard gauge for the Cape Government Railways in 1873, although it had already been established in Australia and New Zealand before that. It was adopted as a standard in New Zealand, South Africa, Indonesia, Japan, the Philippines, Taiwan, and Queensland (which has the second largest narrow gauge network in the world) in Australia.

History
1795 One of the first railways to use  gauge was the Little Eaton Gangway in England, constructed as a horse-drawn wagonway in 1795. Other  gauge wagonways in England and Wales were also built in the early nineteenth century.
1809 The Silkstone Waggonway was opened, connecting the Barnsley Canal to collieries including the Huskar Pit
1860 The Severn and Wye Railway introduces a steam locomotive on its  gauge plateway. 
1862 The Norwegian engineer Carl Abraham Pihl constructed the first  gauge railway in Norway, the Røros Line.
1865 The Queensland Railways were constructed. Its  gauge was promoted by the Irish engineer Abraham Fitzgibbon and consulting engineer Charles Fox.
1867 The construction of the railroad from the Castillo de Buitrón mine to the pier of San Juan del Puerto, Huelva, Spain, began.
1868 In 1868 Charles Fox asks civil engineer Edmund Wragge to survey a  railway in Costa Rica.
1870 The Cape gauge was adopted by New Zealand to expedite the development of transport under Julius Vogel's Great Public Works Policy; see The Vogel Era.  
1871 The Canadian Toronto, Grey and Bruce Railway and the Toronto and Nipissing Railway were opened, promoted by Pihl and Fitzgibbon and surveyed by Wragge as an engineer of Fox. The Canadian province of Prince Edward Island began building its 3 foot 6 network.
1872
 In January Robert Fairlie advocated the use of  gauge in his book Railways Or No Railways: Narrow Gauge, Economy with Efficiency v. Broad Gauge, Costliness with Extravagance.
 The first  gauge railway opened in Japan. It had been proposed by the British civil engineer Edmund Morel based on his experience building railways in New Zealand.
1873
 On 1 January, the first  gauge railway was opened in New Zealand, constructed by the British firm John Brogden and Sons. Earlier built  and broad gauge railways were soon converted to the narrower gauge.
 The Cape Colony adopted the  gauge. After conducting several studies in southern Europe, the Molteno Government selected the gauge as being the most economically suited for traversing steep mountain ranges. Beginning in 1873, under supervision of Railway engineer of the Colony William Brounger, the Cape Government Railways rapidly expanded and the gauge became the standard for southern Africa.
Other new railways in Southern Africa, notably Mozambique, Bechuanaland, the Rhodesias, Nyasaland and Angola, were also constructed in  gauge during that time.
After 1876 In the late nineteenth and early twentieth century numerous  gauge tram systems were built in the United Kingdom and the Netherlands. Newfoundland began its Cape gauge network in 1881.

Nomenclature
The most common name for this gauge is Cape gauge, named after the Cape Colony in what is now South Africa, which adopted it in 1873. "Cape gauge" was used in several English-speaking countries. The equivalent of Cape gauge is used in other languages, such as the Dutch kaapspoor, German Kapspur, Norwegian kappspor and French voie cape. After metrication in the 1960s, the gauge was referred to in official South African Railways publications as  instead of 1067 mm.

In Sweden, the gauge was nicknamed Blekinge gauge, as most of the railways in the province of Blekinge had this gauge.

Colonial Gauge was used in New Zealand.

In Australia the imperial (pre-metric) term 3 foot 6 inch is used.

It is defined in metric units.

Similar gauges
Similar, but incompatible without wheelset adjustment, rail gauges in respect of aspects such as cost of construction, practical minimum radius curves and the maximum physical dimensions of rolling stock are:
 ,
 ,
 ,
 , and
 .

Dual gauge between  gauge and another similar gauge can make these bonus gauges.
 ,
 , (4 ft 6 in gauge railway)  and
 
  (The maximum bonus gauge from  meter gauge gauntlet tracks).

Usage

See also

Cape Government Railways
Heritage railway
List of track gauges

References

External links
 South African Trains – A Pictorial Encyclopaedia
 Why Did Japan Choose the 3'6" Narrow Gauge?